November 11 - Eastern Orthodox liturgical calendar - November 13

All fixed commemorations below celebrated on November 25 by Eastern Orthodox Churches on the Old Calendar.

For November 12th, Orthodox Churches on the Old Calendar commemorate the Saints listed on October 30.

Saints
 Prophet Ahijah the Shilonite (Achias) (960 BC)
 Martyr Arsacius (Arsakios), by the sword.
 Martyrs Anthony, Zevinus, Germanus, Nicephorus and virgin-martyr Maratho, under Diocletian (c. 286-305)  (see also: November 13)
 Venerable Martin the Merciful (Martin of Tours), Bishop of Tours (397)  (see also: October 12, November 11, July 4)
 Venerable Nilus the Faster, of Sinai (451)
 Saint John the Merciful, Patriarch of Alexandria (c. 616-620)

Pre-Schism Western saints
 Saint Rufus of Avignon, venerated as the first Bishop of Avignon in France (c. 200)
 Saint Renatus (René), Bishop of Angers in France, and by tradition of Sorrento in the south of Italy (c. 422)
 Saint Evodius, Bishop of Le Puy in France (c. 560)
 Saint Emilian of Cogolla, Hermit, of Vergegio in Spain (574)
 Saint Machar (Macharius, Mochumna), Bishop of Aberdeen (6th century)
 Saint Sinnell of Cleenish (Senilis), Ireland (6th century)
 Saint Himerius (Imier), a hermit in the Jura in Switzerland, now called after him Immertal, Val-Saint-Imier (c. 610)
 Saint Cummian Fada (Cumianus), a monk at Clonfert, who founded the monastery of Kilcummin (662)
 Saint Cunibert, Bishop of Cologne in Germany, an untiring builder of churches and monasteries (c. 663)
 Saint Cadwaladr (Catuvelladurus), King of the Welsh (664)
 Saint Paternus, born in Brittany, he was a monk at Cessier and then at Saint-Pierre-le-Vif near Sens in France, murdered by evildoers (c. 726)
 Saint Lebuinus (Liafwine, Leafwine), Apostle of the Frisians and patron of Deventer (c. 773)
 Saint Namphasius (Namphrase), a hermit near Marcillac in France, after a military career (c. 800) 
 Saint Ymar, a monk at the monastery of Reculver in Kent in England, martyred by the Danes (c. 830) 
 Saints Benedict, John, Matthew, Isaac and Christinus (Christian), monks from Italy who followed St Adalbert of Prague, murdered at their monastery near Gnesen, Poland (1005)
 Saint Astericus of Pannonhalma (Astricus, Ascrick), first Abbot of Břevnov Monastery, then first Abbot of Pannonhalma, and Archbishop of Kalocsa (c. 1035)

Post-Schism Orthodox saints
 Saint Leontius, Patriarch of Constantinople (c. 1143)
 Blessed John "the Hairy", Fool-for-Christ, of Rostov (1580)
 Venerable Nilus the Myrrh-gusher, of Mount Athos (1651)
 New Martyr Sabbas Nigdelis the Samoladan, beheaded at Koutzouk-Karamani, Constantinople, buried in Eğri Kapı ("Crooked Gate") (1726)
 New Martyr Nicholas of Six Marmara, at Constantinople (1732)
 New Martyrs and Confessors of Năsăud, Romania (1763): 
 Athanasius Todoran, Basil Dumitru, Gregory Manu, and Basil Oichi.

New martyrs and confessors
 New Hieromartyr Alexander Adrianov, priest of the Ekaterinburg Diocese (1918)
 New Hieromartyrs Constantine Uspensky, Vladimir Krasnovsky, Alexander Archangelsky, Matthew Aloin and Demetrius Rozanov, Priests (1937)
 New Hieromartyr Boris (1942)

Other commemorations
 Icon of the Mother of God "Kykkiotissa" ("The Merciful", "Milostivaya"), from Kykkos Monastery on Cyprus.  (see also: December 26 )
 Commemoration of the miracle (1718) of Saint Spyridon the Wonderworker (348), when the Latins wanted to place their own altar in his church on Corfu.
 Repose of Righteous Cosmas of Birsk (1882)
 Commemoration of the righteous monks and laymen buried at Optina Monastery, including:
 Virgin maiden Barbara (1900);
 Hieromonk Basil; Riassaphore-monks Trophimus and Therapontus (1993);
 the youth George (1994)

Icon gallery

Notes

References

Sources
 November 12/November 25. Orthodox Calendar (PRAVOSLAVIE.RU).
 November 25 / November 12. HOLY TRINITY RUSSIAN ORTHODOX CHURCH (A parish of the Patriarchate of Moscow).
 November 12. OCA - The Lives of the Saints.
 The Autonomous Orthodox Metropolia of Western Europe and the Americas (ROCOR). St. Hilarion Calendar of Saints for the year of our Lord 2004. St. Hilarion Press (Austin, TX). pp. 84–85.
 The Twelfth Day of the Month of November. Orthodoxy in China.
 November 12. Latin Saints of the Orthodox Patriarchate of Rome.
 The Roman Martyrology. Transl. by the Archbishop of Baltimore. Last Edition, According to the Copy Printed at Rome in 1914. Revised Edition, with the Imprimatur of His Eminence Cardinal Gibbons. Baltimore: John Murphy Company, 1916. pp. 349–350.
 Rev. Richard Stanton. A Menology of England and Wales, or, Brief Memorials of the Ancient British and English Saints Arranged According to the Calendar, Together with the Martyrs of the 16th and 17th Centuries. London: Burns & Oates, 1892. pp. 535–537.
Greek Sources
 Great Synaxaristes:  12 ΝΟΕΜΒΡΙΟΥ. ΜΕΓΑΣ ΣΥΝΑΞΑΡΙΣΤΗΣ.
  Συναξαριστής. 12 Νοεμβρίου. ECCLESIA.GR. (H ΕΚΚΛΗΣΙΑ ΤΗΣ ΕΛΛΑΔΟΣ).
  12/11/2016. Ορθόδοξος Συναξαριστής. 
Russian Sources
  25 ноября (12 ноября). Православная Энциклопедия под редакцией Патриарха Московского и всея Руси Кирилла (электронная версия). (Orthodox Encyclopedia - Pravenc.ru).
  12 ноября по старому стилю  /  25 ноября по новому стилю. Русская Православная Церковь - Православный церковный календарь на 2016 год.

November in the Eastern Orthodox calendar